Olga Šplíchalová (born September 1, 1975 in Třebíč, Vysočina) is a retired female freestyle swimmer from the Czech Republic, who twice competed for her native country at the Olympic Games: in 1992 and 1996.

References
 sports-reference

1975 births
Living people
Czech female swimmers
Czech female freestyle swimmers
Swimmers at the 1992 Summer Olympics
Swimmers at the 1996 Summer Olympics
Olympic swimmers of Czechoslovakia
Olympic swimmers of the Czech Republic
European Aquatics Championships medalists in swimming
Czechoslovak female swimmers
Universiade medalists in swimming
Sportspeople from Třebíč
Universiade bronze medalists for the Czech Republic
Medalists at the 1997 Summer Universiade